An economic and monetary union (EMU) is a type of trade bloc that features a combination of a common market, customs union, and monetary union. Established via a trade pact, an EMU constitutes the sixth of seven stages in the process of economic integration. An EMU agreement usually combines a customs union with a common market. A typical EMU establishes free trade and a common external tariff throughout its jurisdiction. It is also designed to protect freedom in the movement of goods, services, and people. This arrangement is distinct from a monetary union (e.g., the Latin Monetary Union), which does not usually involve a common market. As with the economic and monetary union established among the 27 member states of the European Union (EU), an EMU may affect different parts of its jurisdiction in different ways. Some areas are subject to separate customs regulations from other areas subject to the EMU. These various arrangements may be established in a formal agreement, or they may exist on a de facto basis. For example, not all EU member states use the Euro established by its currency union, and not all EU member states are part of the Schengen Area. Some EU members participate in both unions, and some in neither.

Territories of the United States, Australian External Territories and New Zealand territories each share a currency and, for the most part, the market of their respective mainland states. However, they are generally not part of the same customs territories.

History 
Several countries initially attempted to form an EMU at the Hague Summit in 1969. Afterward, a "draft plan" was announced. During this time, the main member presiding over this decision was Pierre Werner, Prime Minister of Luxembourg.

Processes in the European EMU 

The EMU involves four main activities.

The first responsibility is to be in charge of implementing effective monetary policy for the euro area with price stability. There is a group of economists whose only role is studying how to improve the monetary policy while maintaining price stability. They conduct research, and their results are presented to the leaders of the EMU. Thereafter, the role of the leaders is to find a suitable way to implement the economists' work into their country's policies. Maintaining price stability is a long-term goal for all states in the EU, due to the effects it might have on the Euro as a currency.

Secondly, the EMU must coordinate economic and fiscal policies in EU countries. They must find an equilibrium between the implementation of monetary and fiscal policies. They will advise countries to have greater coordination, even if that means having countries tightly coupled with looser monetary and tighter fiscal policy. Not coordinating the monetary market could result in risking an unpredictable situation. The EMU also deliberates on a mixed policy option, which has been shown to be beneficial in some empirical studies.

Thirdly, the EMU ensures that the single market runs smoothly. The member countries respect the decisions made by the EMU and ensure that their actions will be in favor of a stable market.

Finally, regulations of the EMU aid in supervising and monitoring financial institutions. There is an imperative need for all members of the EMU to act in unison. Therefore, the EMU has to have institutions supervising all the member states to protect the main aim of the EMU.

Roles of national governments
The economic roles of nations within the EMU are to:
 control fiscal policy that concerns government budgets
 control tax policies that determine how income is raised
 control structural policies that determine pension systems, labor, and capital-market regulations

List of economic and monetary unions 

 Economic and Monetary Union of the European Union (EMU) (1999/2002) with the Euro for the Eurozone members
 de facto the sovereign states in the OECS Eastern Caribbean Currency Union with the East Caribbean dollar in the CSME (2006)
 de facto Switzerland–Liechtenstein

Proposed

Previous EMUs

 Monetary union of the Belgium–Luxembourg Economic Union (1922–2002), superseded by the European EMU.

See also
 North American Union and North American Currency Union (Amero)
 Pacific Union (one proposal for Australian dollar)

References

Further reading
 Acocella, N. and Di Bartolomeo, G. and Tirelli, P. [2007], ‘Fiscal leadership and coordination in the EMU’, in: ‘Open Economies Review’, 18(3): 281–9.

External links
 African monetary union inches closer
 United States of Southern Africa?
 East Africa's first steps towards union
 West Africa opts for currency union
 Gulf States push for single currency
 'Limited gains' from Gulf single currency
 Do the Mercosur Countries Form an Optimum Currency Area?
 Argentina plans monetary union
 Economist – Antipodean currencies (Australia and New Zealand)
 Three Perspectives on an Australasian Monetary Union
 Reasons for the collapse of the Rouble Zone
 In Search of the "Ruble Zone"
 OECD Development Centre – the Rand Zone
 A single African currency in our time?
 South Africa proposes adoption of the rand as provisional SADC common currency

Customs unions
Economic integration
International macroeconomics
Proposed currencies